Richard Alfred Young (16 September 1885 – 1 July 1968) was an English sportsman who played both cricket and association football for England.

As a cricketer he played as a wicket-keeper for Sussex County Cricket Club from 1905 to 1925 and for Cambridge University Cricket Club from 1905 to 1908. He represented England in two Test matches on their 1907–08 tour of Australia. Young was a dual international winning a cap for the England amateur international side against Hungary.

Young was born at Dharwad, Kingdom of Mysore in British India in 1885. He was educated at Repton School, captaining the school cricketeer in his final two years, before going up to King's College, Cambridge in 1904. He won cricket Blues in all four years he was a student. He also played football for the university and played, as an amateur, for Corinthian F.C. His brother was John Young, who also played first-class cricket for Sussex.

Young worked as a teacher of mathematics and cricket at Eton College. He died at Hastings in 1969. He was aged 82.

References

External links
 

1885 births
1968 deaths
England Test cricketers
English cricketers
Sussex cricketers
People from Dharwad
Cambridge University cricketers
Gentlemen cricketers
North v South cricketers
Gentlemen of the South cricketers
Marylebone Cricket Club cricketers
Wicket-keepers
Marylebone Cricket Club Australian Touring Team cricketers
People educated at Repton School
Alumni of King's College, Cambridge